Acalypha suirenbiensis is a species of plant in the family Euphorbiaceae. It is endemic to Hualien County, Taiwan. The Flora of China, however, includes Acalypha hontauyuensis from Orchid Island in this species.

Habitat and conservation
Acalypha suirenbiensis grows near the seashore in thickets, below  asl. It is confined to a single location and is vulnerable to habitat loss.

References

suirenbiensis
Endemic flora of Taiwan
Taxonomy articles created by Polbot